The Agoo–Damortis Protected Landscape and Seascape is located on the eastern side of Lingayen Gulf in southern La Union, Philippines. It was established in 2000 to protect  of coastal area, including mangrove swamps, seagrass beds and stretches of fine black sand beaches. It was first gazetted as a national park in 1965 and was known as the Agoo–Damortis National Seashore Park.

Description
The Agoo–Damortis park is located in 19 coastal barangays in southern La Union from Santa Rita in Agoo to the border with the province of Pangasinan. It is fed by three rivers, namely the Agoo, Bani and Cupang Rivers. The park includes the Santo Tomas Cove (also known as Damortis Cove) in Santo Tomas formed by a sand spit and bank on the western side which extends for  southwards in the sitio of Sungyot. The  cove is the location of large tracts of fishponds, as well as the Santo Tomas Anchorage and Fish Port. On the park's northern portion in Santa Rita is the  Agoo Eco-Tourism World of Fun, an eco-tourism park developed by the local government, which contains a lagoon for fishing, kayaking and other water sport activities, and bicycle lanes along the park's seawall.

Flora and fauna
Mangroves dominate the foreshore area which provide spawning and nursery grounds for fishes and crustaceans, and habitat for both local and migratory birds. Mangrove species in the area include: Avicennia spp.; Nipa fruticans; Pemphis acidula; Rhizophora apiculata; and Rhizophora mucronata.

The slipmouth, goatfish, bream, snapper, grouper, tigerperch and rabbitfish are some species of fish in the area. Vast expanse of seagrass is also found in the area.

References

Protected landscapes and seascapes of the Philippines
Geography of La Union
Tourist attractions in La Union
Protected areas established in 1965
1965 establishments in the Philippines